The following is a comprehensive list of universities in Japan, categorized by prefecture.

The list contains only universities that still exist today and are classified as "schools" according to Article 1 of the School Education Law. (See Daigakkō for universities that are not considered "schools".) Also, each university or college is listed in the prefecture in which its headquarters is located, not the location of their satellite campuses, etc. or that of some of its departments or divisions. For the list of universities that existed in the past or merged into another school, see List of historical universities in Japan.

By prefecture
List is sourced from the Ministry of Education, Culture, Sports, Science and Technology's website.

Aichi

Akita

Aomori

Chiba

Ehime

Fukui

Fukuoka

Fukushima

Gifu

Gunma

Hiroshima

Hokkaido

Hyogo

Ibaraki

Ishikawa

Iwate

Kagawa

Kagoshima

Kanagawa

Kochi

Kumamoto

Kyoto

Mie

Miyagi

Miyazaki

Nagano

Nagasaki

Nara

Niigata

Oita

Okayama

Okinawa

Osaka

Saga

Saitama

Shiga

Shimane

Shizuoka

Tochigi

Tokushima

Tokyo

Tottori

Toyama

Wakayama

Yamagata

Yamaguchi

Yamanashi

See also 
 Higher education in Japan
 List of current and historical women's universities and colleges in Japan
 List of junior colleges in Japan
 List of national universities in Japan
 List of public universities in Japan
 Lists of universities and colleges
 Lists of universities and colleges by country
 National University Corporation
 National Seven Universities

References 

 
Universities
Japan

Japan